Moya is a town located on the island of Anjouan in the Comoros.

References

Populated places in Anjouan